The term evil inclination may refer to:
Concupiscence, in Christian thought;
Yetser hara, in Jewish thought.